Acacia rubricaulis is a shrub belonging to the genus Acacia and the subgenus Juliflorae that is native to a small area in north eastern Australia.

Description
The stout branchlets have a polished appearance and are a dark red colour and glabrous. The branchlets are usually steeply angled towards the apex. Like most species of Acacia it has phyllodes rather than true leaves. The evergreen phyllodes have an ovate or elliptic shape and are usually straight or slightly sickle shaped.

Distribution
It is endemic to the northern part of Cape York Peninsula where it is situated on degraded sand dunes, on dune fields and creek banks growing in sandy soils.

See also
List of Acacia species

References

rubricaulis
Flora of Queensland
Taxa named by Leslie Pedley
Plants described in 2006